Dravuni (pronounced ) is a volcanic island in the Kadavu Group of islands in Fiji.

The island is inhabited by approximately 125 people and is the most northern of several inhabited islands within the Great Astrolabe Reef.

Just north of the Astrolabe lies Solo Reef, an atoll where according to local legend there used to be a village that sunk into the sea. Villagers who fish there respect this legendary village by not throwing garbage overboard.

Dravuni is also home to The University of the South Pacific (USP) research facility which is currently being used by Coral Cay Conservation as the main base for conducting surveys on the reefs by invitation of the Fijian Ministry of Tourism.

The former Foreign Minister and diplomat Kaliopate Tavola is a native of Dravuni.

References

External links
 Coral Cay homepage
 USP Dravuni page
 Kaliopate Tavola's website on Dravuni history and culture

Kadavu Group
Islands of Fiji